Every Waking Moment is Citizen Cope's third album, and his second with the RCA Records label. Every Waking Moment peaked at number 69 on the Billboard 200 on September 30, 2006.

Track listing
 "Back Together" – 3:06
 "Every Waking Moment" – 3:51
 "Friendly Fire" – 3:42
 "More Than It Seems" – 5:23
 "Brother Lee" – 3:49
 "107 Degrees" – 5:11
 "Somehow" – 4:22
 "John Lennon"  – 2:51
 "All Dressed Up" – 3:54
 "Awe" – 4:11
 "Left for Dead" – 2:03
 "Bullet and a Target" (live) (iTunes bonus track)

Charts

References

2006 albums
Citizen Cope albums